Kathleen M. Fitzpatrick  is an American diplomat and career member of the Senior Foreign Service who served as the United States Ambassador to East Timor from 2018 to 2020. She has served as a diplomat since 1983. Fitzpatrick is the former Principal Deputy Assistant Secretary in the Bureau of Intelligence and Research at the United States Department of State. She was nominated to be the United States Ambassador to East Timor on July 25, 2017. She was confirmed by the Senate on November 2, 2017. She was sworn in on December 22, 2017. She left her mission on November 18, 2020.

Personal life
Fitzpatrick speaks Spanish, French, Russian, Dutch and Arabic.

References

Living people
Year of birth missing (living people)
21st-century American diplomats
Ambassadors of the United States to East Timor
American women ambassadors
Georgetown University alumni
National War College alumni
People from Hyattsville, Maryland
Trump administration personnel
United States Foreign Service personnel
University of Dayton alumni
21st-century American women
American women diplomats